The acrobatic cavy (Kerodon acrobata) also known as the Acrobatic Moco and Climbing Cavy is a cavy species native to Brazil in the Amazon rainforest. It is found from Goiás state to Tocantins state, west of the Espigão Mestre, Serra Geral de Goiás, and is also found in Terra Ronca State Park.

Diet 
They are herbivores known to eat a generalized diet of leaves, flowers, bud, bark and fruit from 16 different types of native plantations.

Habitat 
Found in seasonally dry areas of the Amazon rainforest , often in limestone outcrops and emerge to forage and climb trees.

Appearance 
Acrobatic Cavies are a large rodent averaging 1 kg in weight, their fur ranges from dark grey to light brown with orange-brown feet, mostly observed on hindfeet. Their tails are vestigial.

Phylogeny 
The Acrobatic Cavy belongs to the order Rodentia, in the family Caviidae (Guinea-pig like rodents) which has two subfamilies (formerly three) with Acrobatic Cavies being in a new subfamily Hydrochaerinae alongside Capybaras and the closely related Rock Cavy from Eastern Brazil.

References
"Kerodon acrobata Moojen, Locks & Langguth 1997 - Plazi TreatmentBank". treatment.plazi.org. Retrieved 2022-06-19.

de Souza Portella, Alexandre; Vieira, Emerson M. (2016-07-01). "Diet and trophic niche breadth of the rare acrobatic cavy Kerodon     acrobata (Rodentia: Caviidae) in a seasonal environment". Mammal Research. 61 (3): 279–287. doi:10.1007/s13364-016-0275-z. ISSN  2199-241X.

Cavies
Mammals of Brazil
Mammals described in 1997
Endemic fauna of Brazil